Worrall is an English village in Sheffield in the county of South Yorkshire.

Worrall may also refer to:

Surname
David Worrall (born 1990), English association football player
David Worrall (composer) (born 1954), Australian composer
Denis Worrall (born 1935), South African academic, businessman, and former politician and diplomat
Ernest Worrall (1898–1972), English artist
Frank Worrall (born 1961), English journalist and author
Fred Worrall (fl. 1930s), English association football player
George Worrall (1855–1930), English association football player
Harry Worrall (1918–1979), English association football player
Jack Worrall (1861–1937), Australian rules footballer, cricketer, coach, sports journalist
James Worrall (born 1914), Canadian lawyer, olympic athlete, sports administrator
 Joe Worrall (referee) (born 1945), English football referee
 Joe Worrall (footballer) (born 1997), English footballer
John Worrall (disambiguation) (several people)
Madeleine Worrall (born 1977), Scottish actress (i.a. Foyle's War)
Simon Worrall (born 1984), English rugby league player
William P. Worrall (1827-1887), American politician

Middle name
Antony Worrall Thompson (born 1951), English celebrity chef
Thomas Worrall Casey (1869–1949), English politician
Thomas Worrall Kent (born 1922), English born Canadian economist, journalist, public servant
William Worrall Mayo (1819–1911), English born American medical doctor and chemist (Mayo Clinic)

Other
Worrall Covered Bridge, covered bridge in Rockingham, Vermont, United States

See also 
 Worrell (disambiguation)

English-language surnames